The 5th Critics' Choice Awards were presented on January 24, 2000, honoring the finest achievements of 1999 filmmaking.

Top 10 films
(in alphabetical order)

 American Beauty
 Being John Malkovich
 The Cider House Rules
 The Green Mile
 The Insider
 Magnolia
 Man on the Moon
 The Sixth Sense
 The Talented Mr. Ripley
 Three Kings

Winners

 Best Actor:
 Russell Crowe – The Insider
 Best Actress:
 Hilary Swank – Boys Don't Cry
 Best Animated Feature:
 Toy Story 2
 Best Child Performer:
 Haley Joel Osment – The Sixth Sense
 Best Composer:
 Gabriel Yared – The Talented Mr. Ripley
 Best Director:
 Sam Mendes – American Beauty
 Best Family Film:
 October Sky
 Best Feature Documentary:
 Buena Vista Social Club
 Best Foreign Language Film:
 All About My Mother (Todo sobre mi madre) • Spain
 Best Picture:
 American Beauty
 Best Picture Made For Television:
 RKO 281 / Tuesdays with Morrie (TIE)
 Best Screenplay – Adapted:
 The Green Mile – Frank Darabont
 Best Screenplay – Original:
 American Beauty – Alan Ball
 Best Song:
 "Music of My Heart" – Music of the Heart
 Best Supporting Actor:
 Michael Clarke Duncan – The Green Mile
 Best Supporting Actress:
 Angelina Jolie – Girl, Interrupted
 Breakthrough Performer:
 Spike Jonze – Being John Malkovich and Three Kings

References

Broadcast Film Critics Association Awards
1999 film awards